The Campeonato Pernambucano 2008 is the 94th edition of the Campeonato Pernambucano. The competition was won by Sport.

Format

Série A1 (A1 Series)

The Campeonato Pernambucano is divided into two rounds: Taça Tabocas e Guararapes (Tabocas and Guararapes Cup) and Taça Confederação do Equador (Confederation of the Equator Cup). In 2008, they will have two different formats.

The Tabocas and Guararapes Cup consists of two stages. In the first, the twelve teams are divided into three groups (by geographic criteria) and play with the other teams of the same group. After six rounds, the teams will be redistributed in other three groups (by technical criteria) and, again, play with the other teams of the same group. At the end of the 12 rounds, the team with the best campaign will be declared winner of this Cup.

The Confederation of the Equator Cup consists of two groups of six teams each, playing against each other twice. On Group G, the participating clubs are the six teams with the best campaigns on the first Cup. On Group H the participating clubs are the six teams with the worst campaigns on the first Cup. The Cup winner will be the team with the best campaign after the 10th round of the Group G. The two worst campaigns after 10 rounds of Group H will be relegated to the following year's second level. 

The Campeonato Pernambucano will be decided in two extra matches between the winner of the two Cups. If a club win the two cups it is declared as the Campeonato Pernambucano 2008 champions.

Participating clubs

Taça Tabocas e Guararapes

First stage

Second stage

Taça Confederação do Equador
Second stage groups

References
 Gazeta Esportiva

2008
Pernambucano